Adel Lakhdari (in arabic : عادل لخضري) (born 12 August 1989) is an Algerian football player who plays for US Biskra in the Algerian Ligue Professionnelle 2.

Club career
On January 12, 2011, Lakhdari signed a -year contract with ES Sétif.

Honours
 Won the Algerian Cup once with ES Sétif in 2012

References

External links
 Adel Lakhdari profile at dzfoot.com

1989 births
Living people
Algerian footballers
Algeria under-23 international footballers
US Biskra players
ES Sétif players
ASO Chlef players
MO Béjaïa players
MC Oran players
Algerian Ligue Professionnelle 1 players
Association football defenders
21st-century Algerian people